Jan Palthe (14 February 1717 in Deventer – 24 June 1769 in Leyden) was an 18th-century portraitist of the Northern Netherlands.

Biography
He was the son of Gerhard Jan Palthe who taught him to paint. In 1742 he became a member of the Leidse tekenacademie, part of the Leiden Guild of St. Luke. He is known for portrait paintings and etchings. His brother Anthonie, who was also trained as a portrait painter, married Agatha Ketel and began a business in wall paper, a new and popular form of interior decoration. When his brother died, his sister-in-law Agatha married the painter Wybrand Hendricks.

References

 biography in French
 Jan Palthe Portretschilder 1717–1769, Peggie Breitbarth, Exhibition Catalog 28 May – 28 August 2000, Historisch Museum Het Palthe Huis- Oldenzaal
 Bénézit: Dictionnaires des peintres tome 10
 Neues Allgemeines Künstler Lexicon München 1841 tome 10
 De nieuwe schouburg der nederlantsche kunstschilders, by Jan van Gool, 1751

1717 births
1769 deaths
18th-century Dutch painters
18th-century Dutch male artists
Dutch male painters
Dutch portrait painters
People from Deventer